The Sentinel is a 2006 American political action thriller film directed by Clark Johnson about a veteran United States Secret Service special agent who is suspected as a traitor after an attempted assassination of the president reveals that someone within the Service is supplying information to the assassins.

The film stars Michael Douglas as the veteran agent, Kiefer Sutherland as his protégé, Eva Longoria as a rookie Secret Service agent, and Kim Basinger in the role of the First Lady. It is based on the 2003 novel of the same name by former Secret Service Agent Gerald Petievich. It was filmed in Washington, D.C. and in the Canadian cities of Toronto and Kleinburg, Ontario.

Plot
Pete Garrison is a Secret Service agent and one of the personal bodyguards for First Lady of the United States Sarah Ballentine, with whom he is having an affair. He is one of the oldest and most experienced agents, having been involved in saving Ronald Reagan's life. His close friend and fellow agent, Charlie Merriweather is murdered. Garrison is told by a reliable informant that the killing of Merriweather is linked to an assassination plot against the President. The intelligence given by the informant reveals the existence of a mole with access to the President's security detail.

The Secret Service Protective Intelligence Division, led by Garrison's estranged friend and former protégé David Breckinridge with rookie partner Jill Marin, is tasked with investigating the plot. Breckinridge orders every agent to be subjected to a polygraph test. Meanwhile, the mole discovers the discussion with the informant and Garrison's affair with the first lady, and attempts to blackmail Garrison by luring him to a coffee shop known to be a meeting point for a Colombian cartel. After delaying for some time, Garrison is subjected to a polygraph. The agent in charge of the Presidential Protective Division, William Montrose decides to randomly select the means of transporting the president using a coin toss. As the President and first lady visit Camp David, Garrison's informant calls, demanding that his payment be made at a shopping mall food court. Garrison goes to meet him, but he disappears in the crowd, and an assassin tries to kill Garrison. The agents pursue the assassin, but he escapes. Simultaneously, the presidential helicopter is shot down by a surface-to-air missile outside of Camp David, though neither the President nor his wife were aboard (due to Montrose's coin "deciding" to use the motorcade instead).

Garrison failed the polygraph test due to concealing his affair with the First Lady. Breckinridge confronts him at his home and interrogates him, pinning him as the prime suspect. The source of rancor between them comes to light: Breckinridge believes Garrison had an affair with his wife and caused the breakup of their marriage, which Garrison denies. Garrison escapes capture and conducts his own investigation of the assassination plot. He tries to contact the informant who gave him the tip, but finds that he has been killed. In pursuit, Breckinridge gets the drop on Garrison but is unable to kill him, despite having given other agents "shoot to kill" orders. Using his contacts with sympathetic agents and family members, Garrison tracks down the location of one of the assassins, whom he kills in a firefight. He searches his apartment, finding evidence that shows the perpetrators are headed to Toronto to attack the president at a G8 summit. He leaves it in the apartment and tells Marin about it, but the Secret Service find that the evidence and body of the assassin were removed before they arrived.

The President's wife discloses her affair with Garrison to Breckinridge, who now understands why Garrison failed his polygraph test. Together in Toronto, Garrison and Breckinridge learn that the assassins are former KGB operatives hired to kill the president by a Colombian cartel and the mole, William Montrose, who was never polygraphed. Montrose is in charge of directing security at the summit. The leader of the assassins blackmails Montrose into helping him, threatening the agent's family. Emotionally torn, Montrose is instructed to jam Secret Service's radios, and leave the summit with the President via a specific route; the assassins will handle the remainder of the work.

On the night of the President's speech, Breckinridge and Garrison race to the summit. The assassins, posing as Royal Canadian Mounted Police Emergency Response Team officers, kill several agents and corner Montrose and the President in a tunnel. Montrose reveals his treason to the President and purposely steps in front of one of the assassins, who kills him. Garrison, Breckinridge and Marin arrive, rescuing the President and the First Lady and killing the assassins. As they reach the ground level, Montrose's handler comes forward dressed as an RCMP officer to personally perform the killings. He takes Sarah hostage and aims his pistol at the President, but Garrison shoots him dead. In spite of these events, Garrison is forced to take an early retirement due to the disclosure of his affair with the first lady, who looks on sadly from her window as Garrison leaves the White House. He does, however, make peace with Breckinridge, who finally realizes that Garrison did not sleep with his wife. Breckinridge tells Garrison that he has a date with her that evening.

Cast
 Michael Douglas as Secret Service Agent Pete Garrison
 Kiefer Sutherland as Secret Service Agent David Breckinridge
 Eva Longoria as Secret Service Agent Jill Marin
 Kim Basinger as First Lady Sarah Ballentine
 David Rasche as President John Ballentine
 Martin Donovan as Secret Service Agent Bill Montrose
 Ritchie Coster as The Handler
 Blair Brown as National Security Advisor
 Nancy Ajram as Herself
 Kristin Lehman as Cindy Breckinridge
 Raynor Scheine as Walter Xavier
 Chuck Shamata as Director Overbrook
 Paul Calderón as Deputy Director Cortes
 Clark Johnson as Secret Service Agent Charlie Merriweather
 Raoul Bhaneja as Secret Service Agent Aziz Hassad
 Yanna McIntosh as Secret Service Agent Teddy Vargas
 Joshua Peace as Secret Service Agent Davies
 Simon Reynolds as Secret Service Agent Tom DiPaola
 Geza Kovacs as Secret Service Agent Turzanski
 Jasmin Geljo as Assassin
 Danny A. Gonzales as FBI Agent Hugo Ortega
 Jude Coffey as Secret Service Agent Welke
 Gloria Reuben as Mrs. Merriweather

Critical reception
The Sentinel received generally poor reviews. On Rotten Tomatoes, the film has a score of 35% based on 135 reviews, with an average rating of 5.10/10. The site's consensus reads, "The Sentinel starts off well enough but quickly wears thin with too many plot holes and conventional action sequences." On Metacritic, the film has a score of 49 out of 100 based on 32 reviews, indicating "mixed or average reviews". The BBC review described it as being "as compelling as watching the ink dry on a superfluous UN treaty". Some other reviewers, such as Kenneth Turan of Los Angeles Times, enjoyed the film. Roger Ebert gave the film 3 out of 4 stars.

DVD and Blu-ray release

References

External links

 
 
 White House Museum - How well did the moviemakers recreate the White House? (Review)

2006 films
2006 action thriller films
2006 crime thriller films
20th Century Fox films
American action thriller films
American crime thriller films
American political thriller films
Films about the United States Secret Service
Films based on American novels
Films about fictional presidents of the United States
Films directed by Clark Johnson
Films produced by Michael Douglas
Films scored by Christophe Beck
Films set in Toronto
Films set in Washington, D.C.
Films set in the White House
Films shot in Toronto
Films with screenplays by George Nolfi
Regency Enterprises films
Films produced by Arnon Milchan
2000s English-language films
2000s American films